Benjamin Van Mooy is an oceanographer and senior scientist at the Woods Hole Oceanographic Institution located in Woods Hole, MA. His work primarily focuses on chemical oceanography, with a particular focus on the production and remineralization of marine organic matter.

He is credited with the discovery of sulfolipid substitution for phospholipids in marine plankton in times of phosphorus scarcity., and the production of viral glycosphingolipids as a result of infection from coccolithoviruses in Emiliania huxleyii

Most cited publications
Reddy CM, Arey JS, Seewald JS, Sylva SP, Lemkau KL, Nelson RK, Carmichael CA, McIntyre CP, Fenwick J, Ventura GT, Van Mooy BA. Composition and fate of gas and oil released to the water column during the Deepwater Horizon oil spill. Proceedings of the National Academy of Sciences. 2012 Dec 11;109(50):20229-34.  According to Google Scholar, it has been cited 629 times.
Camilli R, Reddy CM, Yoerger DR, Van Mooy BA, Jakuba MV, Kinsey JC, McIntyre CP, Sylva SP, Maloney JV. Tracking hydrocarbon plume transport and biodegradation at Deepwater Horizon. Science. 2010 Oct 8;330(6001):201-4. According to Google Scholar, this article has been cited 830  times    
Van Mooy BA, Fredricks HF, Pedler BE, Dyhrman ST, Karl DM, Koblížek M, Lomas MW, Mincer TJ, Moore LR, Moutin T, Rappé MS. Phytoplankton in the ocean use non-phosphorus lipids in response to phosphorus scarcity. Nature. 2009 Mar;458(7234):69-72. According to Google Scholar, this article has been cited 610  times    
Buesseler KO, Lamborg CH, Boyd PW, Lam PJ, Trull TW, Bidigare RR, Bishop JK, Casciotti KL, Dehairs F, Elskens M, Honda M. Revisiting carbon flux through the ocean's twilight zone. science. 2007 Apr 27;316(5824):567-70. According to Google Scholar, this article has been cited 577  times    
Van Mooy BA, Rocap G, Fredricks HF, Evans CT, Devol AH. Sulfolipids dramatically decrease phosphorus demand by picocyanobacteria in oligotrophic marine environments. Proceedings of the National Academy of Sciences. 2006 Jun 6;103(23):8607-12. According to Google Scholar, this article has been cited 323  times

References 

Living people
Year of birth missing (living people)
Place of birth missing (living people)
American oceanographers
Woods Hole Oceanographic Institution